ITHS can refer to the following

 IT History Society
 International Turkish Hope School, Dhaka